Laetitia Mancieri (born 19 April 1983) is a French rhythmic gymnast. She represented France at the Olympic Games in 2000.

Career 
In 2000 Mancieri was selected as a member of the French group to compete at the Olympic Games held in Sydney, Australia. They scored 37.900 points in the qualifying round with teammates Anna-Sofie Doyen, Anne-Laure Klein, Anna-Sophie Lavoine, Magalie Poisson and Vanessa Sauzede. They finished in ninth place after qualification, not managing to reach the final.

References

1983 births
Living people
French rhythmic gymnasts
Gymnasts at the 2000 Summer Olympics
Olympic gymnasts of France